This is a list of some of the notable Hindu temples in Bangladesh by district:

Bagerhat District 
Swopon Bosu
Horisova Temple
Radhe Shyam Temple

Bandarban District
Bandarban Durga Temple

Barguna District
sarvajanik akhara mandir barguna

Barisal District
 Sugandha Shaktipeeth, Shikarpur, Barisal
 Mahilara Sarkar Math

Bhola District
Shri Madon Mohon Thakur Jiur Mondir

Brahmanbaria District
 Kal Bhairab Temple, Brahmanbaria
 Gopinath Jiu Temple, Fandauk
 Anandamayi Kali Temple, Brahmanbaria
 Pagal Shankar Jiu Temple, Fandauk

Bogra District
 Bhabanipur Shaktipeeth, Bhabanipur, Sherpur Upazila, Bogra

Chandpur District
Shri Mehar Kalibari Temple

Chittagong District
Chatteshwari Temple
 Ramakrishna Mission
 ISKCON Prabartak Shree Krishna Temple
 ISKCON Shree Radha Madhava Temple
 Kaibalyadham Ashram
 Anukulchandra Satsang Ashram
 Tulsi Dham Ashram
 Panchanan Dham Ashram
 Golpahar Mohashoshan Kali Temple
 Sadarghat Kali Temple
 Chittagong University Central Temple
 Chandranath Temple, Sitakund
Taracharan Sadhu Ashram, Dhalghat, Patiya Upazila
 Bura Kali Temple, Dhalghat, Patiya Upazila
 Neem Kali Temple, Kalipur, Banshkhali Upazila
Shuklambar Dighi Temple, Chandanaish Upazila
Goshaildanga Shoshan Kali Temple
Nigamananda Paramahansa Ashram
Hazari Lane Shiva Temple
 Sree Radhakrishna Temple, Raipur, Mirsharai Upazila
Middle Tal Baria Worship Temple, Mirsarai Upazila

Comilla District
Lalmai Chandi Temple
Ayachak Ashram, Rahimpur Muradnagar, Comilla.
 Comilla Jagannath Temple, Comilla
 Sri Sri Shiva and Chandi mata temple, Lalmai, Comilla.
 Sri Jagannath Bari temple, Laksam, Kumilla.
Wahedpur Giri Dham

Cox's Bazar District
 Adinath Temple, Moheshkhali, Cox's Bazar

Dhaka District
 Dhakeshwari National Temple, Dhaka
 Joy Kali Temple, Dhaka
 Ramna Kali Temple, Ramna area of Dhaka
 Raksha Kali Mandir, Shakhari Bazar Dhaka
 Shiddeswari Kali Temple, Shiddeswari, Dhaka.
 Ganesh Temple, Lakshmi Bazar, Dhaka. 
 Ganesh temple, Lakshmi Bazar, Dhaka.
 Tapoban Temple Dhaka
Ramakrishna Mission Temple, Dhaka

Dhamrai Upazila
 Dhamrai Jagannath Roth, Dhamrai
 Jashomadhav temple, Dhamrai.
 Shiva temple, Dhamrai.
 Sri Sri Kali temple, Dakshinpara, Dhamrai.

Dinajpur District
 Gopalganj Twin Temple
 Kantaji Temple
 Kaliya jue Temple, Dinajpur

Faridpur District
 Sreedham Sreeangon, Faridpur Sadar

Habiganj District 
 Kali Mata Mandir, Morakari
 Gopal Jiu Ashram (Santdham)

Jessore District
 Jagannath Temple, Vatpara, Abhyanagar, Jessore.
 11-Shiva temple, Vatpara, Abhyanagar, Jessore.
 Jagannath Temple, Keshabpur, Jessore.
 Kalodanga Kali Temple, Bagharpara, Jessore.
 Jora Shiva Temple, Murali more, Jessore.
 Chanchra Shiva Temple, Jessore.
 Sri Rup Sanatan Smriti Tirtha, Ramsara, Abhaynagar, Jessore.
 Radha Krisna mandir , chourasta , jessore

Joypurhat District
Sarbojonin Sri Sri Durga Temple Shampur, Joypurhat

Khagrachhari District
Jagannath Temple

Khulna District
Umananda Shiv Temple
Kalibari Temple
ISKCON Khulna

Kishoreganj District
Shivbari temple

Madaripur District
Jora Bangla Temple

Magura District
 Kali temple, Magura
 Sri Sri Ma Durga temple, Mandal Bari, Baliaghata, Sreepur, Magura
 Sassan Kali temple, Chilgari, Sreepur, Magura

Moulvibazar District
 Patrikul Shiva Temple, Patrikul, Bhunabir, Sreemangal.
 Lord Krishna Temple, Patrikul, Bhunabir, Sreemangal.
 Patrikul Durga Temple, Patrikul, Bhunabir, Sreemangal.
Sri Srimangaleshwari Kali Temple at Sreemangal

Munshiganj District
Sonarang Twin Temples

Mymensingh District
 Boro Kali Bari Temple, Mymensingh
 Three Shiva temple, Muktagacha, Mymensingh.
 Jora Kali temple, Muktagacha, Mymensingh.
 Sri Sri Raj Rajeswari Durga temple, Muktagacha Jamindar Bari, Mymensingh.

Narayanganj District
 Baba Lokenath Brahmachari Ashram, Barodi, Narayanganj, an ashram of Lokenath Brahmachari

Naogaon District 

 Naogaon Sri Sri Kali Matar Prangan

Noakhali District 
Kalyandi Durga Temple

Pabna District
 Jagannath Temple, Pabna, Pabna

Pirojpur District
Kalibari Temple

Rajshahi District
Temple of King Kangsa Narayan
Puthia Temple Complex
Bara Anhik Mandir
Chauchala Chhota Govinda Mandir
Chhota Shiva Mandir
Chota Anhik Mandir
Do-Chala Chhota Ahnik Mandir
Dol-Mandir
Pancha Ratna Govinda Temple
Pancha Ratna Shiva Temple
Tarapur Mandir
Gopal Mandir
 Dhromshova Temple, Ghoramara, Rajshahi.
 Sree Sree Madhov Temple, Court, Rajshahi.
 Chondipur Kali Temple, Rajshahi. 
 Kashiadanga Shiva Temple, Rajshahi.
 Borda Kali Temple, Kumar Para, Rajshahi
 Saheb Bazar Temple, Rajshahi.
 Jora Kali Temple, Rashahi
 Keshavpur Temple, Police Line, Rajshahi.
 Hanumanji Temple, Ganok Para, Rajshahi.
 Bulonpur Ghosh Para Temple, Rajshahi.
 Sree Gourango Temple, Khetor Dham, Rajshahi.
 Shosan Kali Temple, Rajshahi.
 Ghoshpara Temple, Kajla, Rajshahi.
 Shiva Temple, Sree Rampur, Rajshahi.
 Melon Temple, Medical College Ghoshpara, Rajshahi.
 Iskon Temple, Premtoli, Rajshahi.
 Iskon Temple, Ghoramara, Rajshahi.
 Sree Kali Temple, Rajar Hata, Rajshahi.
 Sree Shiva Temple, Hetem Khan, Rajshahi.
 Sree Krishna Temple, Premtoli, Rajshahi.
 Sree Krishna Temple, Rani Bazar, Rajshahi.
 Sree Kali Temple, Fudki Para, Saheb Bazar, Rajshahi.
 Sree Shiva Temple, Bose Para, Rajshahi.
 Sree Shiva Temple, Puthia, Rajshahi.
 Navaratna Temple, Puthia, Rajshahi.
 Sree Shiva Temple, Shekher Chalk, Rajshahi.
 Padma Temple, Ghosh Para, Kumar Para, Rajshahi.
 Baro Ahnik Temple, Rajshahi City, Rajshahi.
 Ponchoboti crematorium Temple, Rajshahi City, Rajshahi.
 Talaimari Kali Temple, Rajshahi City, Rajshahi.
 Charghat Durga Temple, Charghat, Rajshahi.
 Rajshahi University Temple, Charghat, Rajshahi.

Rangpur District
Bolta Para Hari Temple

Satkhira District
 Jeshoreshwari Kali Temple, Shyamnagar, Satkhira

Shariatpur District
Sri Satyanarayan Seva Mandir

Sherpur District
Ma Kali temple

Sirajganj District
Navratna Temple

Sunamganj District
Kejaura Shree Shree Kali Temple, Sunamganj

Sylhet District
Shri Shail

Tangail District
Tangail Kali Temple
Paul Para Nath Temple,Tangail

Thakurgaon District
Sri Sri Radha Gopinath Iskcon Temple, Thakurgaon

See also
 Lists of Hindu temples by country

References

 
Bangladesh
Hindu temples